Vértigo is a Mexican telenovela produced by Valentín Pimstein for Telesistema Mexicano in 1966.

Cast 
Carlos Navarro
Blanca Sánchez
Alicia Montoya
Oscar Morelli
Virginia Gutiérrez
Antonio Medellín
Nancy MacKenzie
Martha Elena Cervantes
Francisco Jambrina
Maggie Campos
Queta Lavat
Tomas I. Jaime

References

External links 

Mexican telenovelas
1966 telenovelas
Televisa telenovelas
Spanish-language telenovelas
1966 Mexican television series debuts
1966 Mexican television series endings